Chingkhei Yumnam (born 26 January 1994) is an Indian footballer who plays as a midfielder for Pailan Arrows in the I-League.

Career

Pailan Arrows
After spending time with the Tata Football Academy, Yumnam signed with Pailan Arrows of the I-League on 19 June 2012. He made his debut for the club during the 2012 Durand Cup against Delhi United at the Ambedkar Stadium in New Delhi on 25 August 2012. He then made his second consecutive start for Pailan Arrows against Air India FC on 28 August 2012 in the Durand Cup as Pailan drew 1–1 and were knocked out on points.

Career statistics

Club
Statistics accurate as of 11 May 2013

References

1994 births
Living people
Footballers from Manipur
Indian footballers
I-League players
Indian Arrows players
Association football midfielders